The 2018 Maine gubernatorial election took place on November 6, 2018, to elect the next governor of Maine. It occurred along with elections for the U.S. Senate, U.S. House, and other state and local elections. Incumbent Republican Governor Paul LePage was term limited and could not seek re-election to a third consecutive term in office although he later announced his campaign for a third term in the 2022 election.

The primaries for this election were the first in Maine to be conducted with ranked choice voting (RCV), as opposed to a simple plurality, after voters passed a citizen referendum approving the change in 2016. An advisory opinion by the Maine Supreme Judicial Court held that RCV would be unconstitutional for general elections for governor and the state legislature. This led state legislators to vote to delay its implementation pending approval of a state constitutional amendment. Backers of a "people's veto" turned in enough signatures to suspend this law until a June referendum vote, which restored RCV for future primary and congressional elections.

Governor Paul LePage threatened not to certify the results of the primary elections, saying he would "leave it up to the courts to decide." He also called the use of ranked-choice voting the "most horrific thing in the world." Secretary of State Matthew Dunlap said the results would be binding regardless of whether LePage certified them.

The Republican nominee was businessman and 2010 independent candidate for governor Shawn Moody. The Democratic candidate was Attorney General Janet Mills. State Treasurer Terry Hayes and businessman Alan Caron had qualified for the ballot as independents, though Caron dropped out on October 29 and endorsed Mills. Former state senator and former mayor of Lewiston and Auburn John Jenkins and perennial candidate Kenneth Capron ran write-in campaigns.

Mills defeated Moody and Hayes with a majority to become the first female Governor of Maine. She also became the first gubernatorial candidate to win at least 50% of the vote since Angus King in 1998, and the first non-incumbent to do so since Kenneth M. Curtis in 1966. Mills also became the first Maine gubernatorial candidate to earn 300,000 votes and received more votes for governor than any other candidate in state history. This also marks the first gubernatorial election a Democrat would win the popular vote in 36 years, the last time being Joseph Brennan in 1982.

Background
Incumbent Republican Paul LePage was term-limited, having been elected twice consecutively in 2010 and 2014. LePage did not win a majority of the vote either time (receiving 37.6% in a crowded four-way race in 2010 and 48.2% in a three-way race in 2014), with Democrats accusing independent candidate Eliot Cutler of splitting the anti-LePage vote in both instances, though Cutler finished closer to LePage than Democratic candidate Libby Mitchell in the 2010 election.

Maine's history of governors elected without majorities, including LePage, was one impetus for the citizen's referendum to implement ranked choice voting. Indeed, the last time a gubernatorial candidate received a majority of the vote was in 1998, when incumbent Governor (and current United States Senator) Angus King, an independent, won reelection with 58.6% of the vote. The last time a non-incumbent candidate received more than 50% of the vote was the 1966 gubernatorial election, which Democrat Kenneth M. Curtis won over incumbent Republican John H. Reed with 53.1% of the vote.

Though ranked-choice voting was approved by voters in a 2016 referendum, the Maine Legislature voted to delay and potentially repeal RCV for all elections after an advisory opinion by the Maine Supreme Judicial Court ruled it unconstitutional for general elections for state offices. RCV supporters succeeded in a people's veto effort to prevent the delay, which suspends it until a June 2018 referendum vote. RCV supporters were victorious in the June referendum, and ranked-choice voting will remain in place for state and federal primaries and federal general elections.

Republican primary
Speculation that U.S. Senator Susan Collins was considering running for governor arose during the 2015 Maine Legislative session when Representative Matt Moonen (D-Portland) introduced a bill to strip the governor (LePage at the time) of the power to appoint replacement U.S. Senators in the event of a vacancy and to instead have a special primary and general election. Moonen denied that he was motivated by Collins's possible candidacy, saying he was interested only in counterbalancing Republican-sponsored bills to change how the Maine Attorney General and Maine Secretary of State are chosen. Moonen said Collins had told him speculation about her running for governor was "silly." Collins, who was the 1994 Republican nominee for Governor, told MPBN News on January 4, 2016 that though she was "baffled" by the rumors about her being interested in running for governor, many had encouraged her to run, and she would not rule it out. In October 2017, Collins said she would not run for governor in 2018.

No Republican candidate ruled out challenging the results of a ranked-choice primary in court. Mary Mayhew called for the immediate repeal of RCV, calling it a "scam" and "probably illegal".

The Maine Republican Party filed a federal lawsuit in U.S. District Court in Bangor on May 4, 2018, seeking to bar the use of RCV for its own primary on the grounds that requiring the party to use it violates its First Amendment rights to choose its nominee as it sees fit. U.S. District Court Judge Jon Levy rejected the suit on May 29.

Candidates

Nominated
Shawn Moody, businessman and independent candidate for governor in 2010

Eliminated in primary
 Ken Fredette, state house minority leader
 Garrett Mason, state senate majority leader
 Mary Mayhew, former commissioner of the Maine Department of Health and Human Services

Withdrawn
 Deril Stubenrod, write-in candidate for the U.S. Senate in 2014
 Mike Thibodeau, Maine Senate president

Declined
 Rick Bennett, former chairman of the Maine Republican Party, former President of the Maine Senate, candidate for the U.S. Senate in 2012 and nominee for ME-02 in 1994
 Susan Collins, U.S. senator and nominee for governor in 1994
 Nick Isgro, Mayor of Waterville
 Bruce Poliquin, U.S. representative (ran for reelection)
 Peter Vigue, businessman

Endorsements

Polling

Results

Democratic primary

Almost all Democratic candidates said that they would abide by the results of the ranked-choice primary, with only Janet Mills refusing to comment on the issue because it was being heard by the courts.

Candidates

Nominated
 Janet Mills, Maine Attorney General

Eliminated in primary
 Adam Cote, attorney, Iraq War veteran and candidate for ME-01 in 2008
 Donna Dion, former mayor of Biddeford
 Mark Dion, state senator and former Cumberland County Sheriff
 Mark Eves, former Speaker of the Maine House of Representatives
 Diane Russell, former state representative
 Betsy Sweet, former director of the Maine Women's Lobby

Failed to make ballot
 Dominic A. Crocitto
 Steve DeAngelis, schoolteacher
 J. Martin Vachon

Withdrawn
 James Boyle, former state senator
 Patrick Eisenhart, retired United States Coast Guard Commander
 Sean Faircloth, former mayor of Bangor and former state senator
 Kenneth Forrest Pinet

Declined
 Justin Alfond, former state senator and former President of the Maine Senate
 Yellow Light Breen, CEO of the Maine Development Foundation
 Adam Goode, former state representative
 Troy Jackson, State Senate Minority Leader
 Stephen King, author
 Chellie Pingree, U.S. Representative
 Hannah Pingree, former Speaker of the Maine House of Representatives
 Lucas St. Clair, nonprofit executive (ran for ME-02)

Endorsements
All endorsers are Democrats unless otherwise specified

Polling

Results

Green Independent primary

Candidates

Withdrawn
 Jay Parker Dresser, candidate for ME-02 in 2016
 Betsy Marsano, activist

Libertarian primary

Candidates

Withdrawn
 Richard Light
 Gilbert P. Doughty

Independents

Candidates

Declared
 Kenneth A. Capron, perennial candidate, systems analyst and fraud investigator(write-in candidate)
 Terry Hayes, Maine State Treasurer
 John Jenkins, former mayor of Lewiston, former mayor of Auburn and former Democratic state senator(write-in candidate)

Capron and Jenkins failed to qualify for the ballot, but continued their campaigns as write-in candidates

Withdrawn
 Ethan Alcorn, businessman (did not qualify)
Alan Caron, president and CEO of Envision Maine (endorsed Mills)
 Aaron D. Chadbourne, writer and activist (write-in candidate, endorsed Moody)

Failed to make ballot
 Karmo Sanders, actress

Declined
 Eliot Cutler, attorney and candidate for governor in 2010 and 2014
 Angus King, U.S. Senator and former governor (running for re-election)
 Peter Vigue, businessman
 Dick Woodbury, former state senator

General election 
After the primaries, most prediction models had the race as a tossup, noting Paul LePage's two victories and Hillary Clinton's narrow margin of victory in the state in the 2016 presidential election. Others considered it to be a pick-up opportunity for the Democrats. Both Moody and Mills received the backing of outside money, with one PAC spending in excess of $1 million on television advertising in the state to support Mills's candidacy.

On October 12, Jonathan Martin of The New York Times published an article detailing a sex discrimination complaint filed against Moody and his business in 2006, which Moody settled for $20,000, resulting in the complaint being withdrawn. The complaint alleged that Moody went to the residence of a female employee and fired her for having a child just days after delivering the child via an emergency caesarean section. Moody denied the allegation through a spokesperson and later on Twitter.

Though the first poll of the race saw Mills and Moody tied for first place with Hayes and Caron lagging behind, by the end of October, four different polls were released, each showing Mills with an eight-point lead over Moody. FiveThirtyEight declared the race "Likely D" when its gubernatorial projections were released in October, though other prediction models maintained the race as a tossup.

On October 29, in a press conference at the main branch of the Portland Public Library, Caron dropped out of the race and endorsed Mills. His name remained on the ballot, but any votes cast for him were regarded as blank.

Shortly before 10 PM on election night, Hayes conceded the race. At 12:15 AM on November 7, Moody conceded the race to Mills, and shortly thereafter Mills declared victory at Democratic headquarters in Portland. Mills became the first Maine gubernatorial candidate to receive more than 300,000 votes in a single election. Mills also became the first Maine gubernatorial candidate to win a majority of the vote since Angus King won nearly 59% of the vote in his re-election bid in 1998, and became the first candidate to win a majority of the popular vote for a first term since Kenneth M. Curtis defeated incumbent governor John H. Reed in 1966, though Curtis and Reed were the only candidates in that race.

The general election used plurality voting, not ranked-choice voting.

Predictions

Endorsements
 Endorsements in bold were made after the primaries on June 12, 2018

Debates

Polling

if ranked-choice voting were used

Results

Results by county

See also
 2018 United States gubernatorial elections

References

External links
 Maine Secretary of State – Elections Division
 Candidates at Vote Smart
 Candidates at Ballotpedia

 Official campaign websites
 Kenneth Capron (I) for Governor
 Terry Hayes (I) for Governor
 John Jenkins (I) for Governor
 Janet Mills (D) for Governor
 Shawn Moody (R) for Governor

Gubernatorial
2018
2018 United States gubernatorial elections